Hospental (locally Oschpidall) is a municipality in the canton of Uri in Switzerland.

History
Hospental is first mentioned in 1285 as Hospenthal. In 1499 it was mentioned under its Latin name as Hospicium, and in 1616 as Spithal.

Geography

Of this area, 32.3% is used for agricultural purposes, while 9.7% is forested. Of the rest of the land, 1.4% is settled (buildings or roads) and the remainder (56.6%) is non-productive (rivers, glaciers or mountains). , 0.8% of the total land area was heavily forested, while 8.9% is covered in small trees and shrubbery. Of the agricultural land, 5.3% is used for orchards or vine crops and 27.1% is used for alpine pastures. Of the settled areas, 0.1% is covered with buildings, 0.3% is classed as special developments, and 1.0% is transportation infrastructure. Of the unproductive areas, 0.1% is unproductive standing water (ponds or lakes), 1.1% is unproductive flowing water (rivers), 34.9% is too rocky for vegetation, and 20.5% is other unproductive land.

The municipality is located in the valley called Urseren at the intersection of the routes over the Furka Pass and the route over the Gotthard Pass. It consists of the linear village of Hospental and the hamlet of Zumdorf.

Demographics
, 1.4% of the population was made up of foreign nationals. Over the last 10 years the population has decreased at a rate of -8.6%. Most of the population speaks German (97.6%), with Rhaeto-Romance being second most common ( 1.5%) and Italian being third ( 0.5%).  the gender distribution of the population was 50.9% male and 49.1% female.

In the 2007 federal election the FDP party received 94.3% of the vote.

In Hospental about 50% of the population (between age 25-64) have completed either non-mandatory upper secondary education or additional higher education (either university or a Fachhochschule).

Hospental has an unemployment rate of 0.33%. , there were 19 people employed in the primary economic sector and about 8 businesses involved in this sector. 4 people are employed in the secondary sector and there are 2 businesses in this sector. 30 people are employed in the tertiary sector, with 13 businesses in this sector.

The historical population is given in the following table:

Tower

The tower was built in the 13th century for the Hospental family, first mentioned in records at the same time, and dominates the village and is a reminder of the importance of the Urserntal valley as a link in central alpine communications for many centuries. Now without floors, it was originally used as a watch tower, and had external covered platforms at the sides.

Church
The Catholic Church of Maria Himmelfahrt was built in 1705-11 by Bartholomaus Schmid. The baroque building has exterior blind arches, like the same architect's parish church in Andermatt.

Haus Müller-Lombardi
The most important historic house in the village is the recently restored patrician family home of the Müller family, known locally as the Haus Müller-Lombardi because the last of the family who lived there, Lina Müller (died 1978) was the nineteenth child of Carl Alois Müller and Genovefa Lombardi. She established a Stiftung (Trust) to preserve the land and buildings (like Haus Wesemli) in the Urseren which were not part of the Stiftung established by her brother Adolfo Müller-Ury, the American portrait painter, for the preservation of the Haus Müller itself.

The house which was erected in 1687 for Johann-Caspar Müller, and whose roof is now returned to its original shape, and now reveals its original red exterior and attractively decorated green-painted windows. Inside the house are portraits of Johann Caspar Müller, his son Johann Sebastian Müller and his wife, as well as other portraits of members of this distinguished local family by Lorenz Justin Ritz and Felix Maria Diogg. There are also works by Adolfo Müller-Ury, the American portrait painter, including portraits of Popes Benedict XV and Pius XII.

Ski area

In Hospental there is a mountain called Winterhorn, which has been disused since 2007. The 2-man chairlift and the T-bar which were used remain in place. It was part of the Skiarena Andermatt-Sedrun.

References

External links
 

Municipalities of the canton of Uri